Dehnow-e Eslamabad (also Romanized as Dehnow-e Eslāmābād) is a village in Chahdegal Rural District, Negin Kavir District, Fahraj County, Kerman Province, Iran. At the 2006 census, its population was 534, in 141 families.

References 

Populated places in Fahraj County